The Circle Maker is a double album by John Zorn featuring Zorn's Masada compositions performed by the Masada String Trio (on Disc One: Issachar) and the Bar Kokhba Sextet (on Disc Two: Zevulun) which was released in 1998 on the Tzadik label.

Reception

The Allmusic review by Joslyn Layne awarded the album 5 stars stating "Zorn skeptics will find the superb and elegant music on The Circle Maker surprisingly stable and accessible... All of these musicians are accomplished in jazz and improvised music, and have performed extensively in world and/or classical settings as well. The Circle Maker is a very necessary recording for all appreciators of chamber jazz, new Jewish music, or any of these stellar musicians."

Track listing 
All compositions by John Zorn
 Disc One: Issachar
 "Tahah" – 2:30
 "Sippur" – 3:21
 "Karet" – 1:21
 "Hadasha" – 5:36
 "Taharah" – 3:51
 "Mispar" – 2:47
 "Ratzah" – 4:36
 "Zebdi" – 1:51
 "Yatzar" – 8:14 - misspelled as "Yatzah" on album sleeve 
 "Malkhut" – 1:57
 "Hodaah" – 3:49
 "Elilah" – 3:21
 "Meholalot" – 4:54
 "Kochot" – 4:58
 "Lachish" – 1:30
 "Shidim" – 4:32
 "Aravot" – 2:58
 "Moshav" – 5:06
 Disc Two: Zevulun
 "Lilin" – 6:58
 "Hazor" – 4:45
 "Kisofim" – 7:23
 "Khebar" – 4:54
 "Laylah" – 2:57
 "Teli" – 4:14
 "Tevel" – 4:27
 "Eitan" – 2:02
 "Ner Tamid" – 2:38
 "Idalah-Abal" – 7:41
 "Gevurah" – 6:51
 Disc One: Issachar – Recorded December 6, 1997, at Avatar Studio, New York City
 Disc Two: Zevulun – Recorded December 7, 1997, at Avatar Studio, New York City

Personnel 
 Disc One: Issachar – All tracks performed by the Masada String Trio
 Mark Feldman – violin
 Erik Friedlander – cello
 Greg Cohen – bass
 Disc Two: Zevulun – All tracks performed by the Bar Kokhba Sextet
 Marc Ribot – guitar
 Cyro Baptista – percussion
 Joey Baron – drums
 Mark Feldman – violin
 Erik Friedlander – cello
 Greg Cohen – bass

Production
 Produced by John Zorn
 Kazunori Sugiyama: Associate Producer
 Jim Anderson: Sound Engineer

References 

1998 albums
Tzadik Records albums
Albums produced by John Zorn
Masada String Trio albums
Bar Kokhba albums
Downtown music albums